Chiara Rosa (born 28 January 1983) is a female shot putter from Italy.

She has won 29 times the individual national championship.

Career
She was 2nd at Universiade, two times 3rd at Mediterranean Games and five times 3rd at European Cup Winter Throwing. She was also 3rd in Bergen 2010 at European Team Championships. Her personal best throw is 19.15 metres, achieved in June 2007 in Milan.

Achievements

National titles
Rosa won 30 national championships at individual senior level.

Italian Athletics Championships
Shot put: in a row, consecutively from 2005 to 2022 (18)
Italian Athletics Indoor Championships
Shot put: 2006, 2008, 2011, 2013, 2014, 2015, 2016, 2017, 2018, 2019, 2020, 2021 (12)

See also
 Italian Athletics Championships - Multi winners
 Italian all-time lists - Shot put

References

External links
 

1983 births
Living people
People from Camposampiero
Italian female shot putters
Athletes (track and field) at the 2008 Summer Olympics
Athletes (track and field) at the 2012 Summer Olympics
Athletes (track and field) at the 2016 Summer Olympics
Olympic athletes of Italy
European Athletics Championships medalists
World Athletics Championships athletes for Italy
Mediterranean Games bronze medalists for Italy
Athletes (track and field) at the 2009 Mediterranean Games
Universiade medalists in athletics (track and field)
Mediterranean Games medalists in athletics
Universiade silver medalists for Italy
Italian Athletics Championships winners
Competitors at the 2005 Summer Universiade
Medalists at the 2009 Summer Universiade
Sportspeople from the Province of Padua
20th-century Italian women
21st-century Italian women